Patrick Collot (born 22 June 1967) is a French football manager and former professional player, who played as a midfielder.

References

1967 births
Living people
Sportspeople from Avignon
French footballers
SC Toulon players
AC Avignonnais players
FC Martigues players
Lille OSC players
Association football midfielders
Ligue 1 players
Ligue 2 players
French football managers
Lille OSC managers
FC Nantes managers
FC Nantes non-playing staff